Baitul Muqueet Mosque is an Ahmadi Muslim mosque in Manukau, Auckland, New Zealand. At the time of opening of the mosque, it was the largest mosque in the country.

History 
The mosque was self-funded by the Ahmadiyya community of Auckland. Inaugurated in 2013, and Mirza Masroor Ahmad, the spiritual leader of the Ahmadiyya community led the first prayers at the mosque.

References

Ahmadiyya mosques in New Zealand
Religious buildings and structures in Auckland
Buildings and structures in Auckland
Mosques completed in 2013